Alo or ALO may refer to:

Arts, entertainment and media
 Alo (film), a 2003 Bengali drama
 Alo Creevey, a fictional character in TV series Skins
 "Alo" (Skins series 5)
 "Alo" (Skins series 6)
 Animal Liberation Orchestra, an American rock band
 Alo!, a newspaper in Serbia

People
 Alo (given name), an Estonian male name, including a list of people with the name
 Alo of Maui (born 1186), 6th Moi of Maui
 ALO (artist) (born 1981), London-based Italian artist
 Biyi Alo (born 1994), English rugby player
 Emmanuel Alo (born 1950), Nigerian biologist
 Jocelyn Alo (born 1998), American softball player 
 William Nwankwo Alo (born 1965), Nigerian official

Places
 Alo (Wallis and Futuna)
 Alo, Mardan, Khyber Pakhtunkhwa, Pakistan
 Ålo, Agder county, Norway

Transportation
 Allegheny Airlines, ICAO code ALO
 Alloa railway station, in Clackmannanshire, Scotland, station code ALO
 Waterloo Regional Airport, in Iowa, U.S., IATA code ALO

Other uses
 Alo TV, a local TV channel in Tartu, Estonia
 Air liaison officer
 Aluminium(II) oxide, symbol AlO
 Alo, the name in Turkey for laundry detergent Tide
 Afghanistan Liberation Organization
 Wakasihu language, ISO 639 language code alo
 H.K.C. ALO, a Dutch korfball team

See also 

 Aalo, a town in India
 Aalo (album), a 2011 album by Warfaze
 Alau, Nepal, a place
 Aloa, a genus of tiger moths
 Fernando Alonso (born 1981), Spanish racing driver
 Paul Alo'o (born 1983), Cameroonian footballer